Mladen Bojinović (born 17 January 1977) is a Serbian former handball player.

Club career
After starting out at his hometown club Borac Banja Luka, Bojinović spent three seasons with Partizan (1996–1999) and won two trophies, before moving to Spain. He played for three Liga ASOBAL teams, namely Ademar León (1999–2000), Bidasoa (2000–2001), and Barcelona (2001–2002).

In 2002, Bojinović moved to France and stayed with Montpellier over the next decade, winning nine national championships. He also won the EHF Champions League in his debut year. In 2012, Bojinović signed with Paris Saint-Germain, helping them win their first ever national championship in the 2012–13 season.

International career
Bojinović made his major international debut for FR Yugoslavia (later known as Serbia and Montenegro) at the 2001 World Championship, winning the bronze medal. He also took part at the 2002 European Championship and 2003 World Championship. Later on, Bojinović represented Serbia and participated in two more World Championships (2009 and 2011).

Honours
Partizan
 Handball Championship of FR Yugoslavia: 1998–99
 Handball Cup of FR Yugoslavia: 1997–98
Barcelona
 Copa ASOBAL: 2001–02
Montpellier
 LNH Division 1: 2002–03, 2003–04, 2004–05, 2005–06, 2007–08, 2008–09, 2009–10, 2010–11, 2011–12
 Coupe de France: 2002–03, 2004–05, 2005–06, 2007–08, 2008–09, 2009–10, 2011–12
 Coupe de la Ligue: 2003–04, 2004–05, 2005–06, 2006–07, 2007–08, 2009–10, 2010–11, 2011–12
 EHF Champions League: 2002–03
Paris Saint-Germain
 LNH Division 1: 2012–13, 2014–15
 Coupe de France: 2013–14, 2014–15

References

External links

 

1977 births
Living people
Sportspeople from Banja Luka
Serbs of Bosnia and Herzegovina
Serbian male handball players
RK Partizan players
CB Ademar León players
FC Barcelona Handbol players
Montpellier Handball players
RK Borac Banja Luka players
Liga ASOBAL players
Expatriate handball players
Serbia and Montenegro expatriate sportspeople in Spain
Serbia and Montenegro expatriate sportspeople in France